Dondice is a genus of sea slugs, aeolid nudibranchs, marine gastropod mollusks in the family Facelinidae.

Species
Species within the genus Dondice include:
 Dondice arianeae García-Méndez, Padula & Valdés, 2022
 Dondice caboensis García-Méndez, Padula & Valdés, 2022
 Dondice freddiemercuryi García-Méndez, Padula & Valdés, 2022
 Dondice galaxiana Millen & Hermosillo, 2012
 Dondice juansanchezi García-Méndez, Padula & Valdés, 2022
 Dondice jupiteriensis García-Méndez, Padula & Valdés, 2022
 Dondice occidentalis Engel, 1925
 Dondice parguerensis Brandon & Cutress, 1985
 Dondice trainitoi Furfaro & Mariottini, 2020
Synonyms
 Dondice banyulensis Portmann & Sandmeier, 1960: synonym of Nemesignis banyulensis (Portmann & Sandmeier, 1960) 
 Dondice nicolae Vicente, 1967: synonym of Dondice banyulensis Portmann & Sandmeier, 1960 : synonym of Nemesignis banyulensis (Portmann & Sandmeier, 1960) 
 Dondice sebastiani (Er. Marcus, 1957): synonym of Nanuca sebastiani Er. Marcus, 1957

References

External links
 Taxonomicon info